Friends & Enemies is a 1999 double-CD compilation album of studio and live material by Fred Frith and Henry Kaiser. It contains the complete collaborative recordings of Frith and Kaiser from 1979 to 1999, namely their two studio albums With Friends Like These (1979) and Who Needs Enemies? (1983), an unreleased live album recorded in 1984, and new studio tracks recorded in 1999. The album was released by Cuneiform Records in June 1999.

Background
Oliver DiCicco was the engineer for Frith and Kaiser's two collaborative albums, With Friends Like These and Who Needs Enemies? at Mobius Music in San Francisco, and for the 1999 studio sessions, also at Mobius Music. DiCicco wrote in the Friends & Enemies liner notes that during these recording sessions he "was free to become part of the creative team in a way that transcended mere audio engineering". He said that this creativity "enriched my life and inspired my own artistry".

DiCicco noted that the duo "possess a very special chemistry", with Frith contributing "compositional and melodic aesthetic", and Kaiser adding "an unfettered approach to sound and guitar technique". While making With Friends Like These in 1979, and Who Needs Enemies? in 1983, DiCicco recognized the significance of what they were doing. But it was only during the 1999 studio sessions that he realised how "far ahead of their time" those recording were. DiCicco said their utilization of noise "predates most of the 'out' genre that followed", and the LinnDrum programming on Who Needs Enemies? and the unreleased live album "predated the '90s drum 'n' bass music by more than a decade".

Reception

In a review of Friends & Enemies in AllMusic, Rick Anderson described Frith and Kaiser's first collaboration, With Friends Like These as "one of the defining documents of the downtown avant-garde scene", and said their improvised duets "essentially redefined the sound of the guitar". He complimented Cuneiform Records on including all of the duo's recorded work in this compilation, and called it "a must for noise fans, skronk hounds, and adventurous guitarheads".

Writing in Exclaim!, David Lewis described the evolution of Frith and Kaiser's collaborations, from the Derek Bailey-inspired improvisations with "skewed riff and oddball time signatures" in With Friends Like These, to their inclusion of drum machines and other technologies in Who Needs Enemies? and their unreleased live album—which Lewis said gave their music "a dated and cheesy appeal", to their latest collaborations in 1999 where they blend new technologies with the "purity and beauty" of their first album. Lewis called Friends & Enemies "essential guitar music", and "[a] gem".

Track listing
All music by Fred Frith and Henry Kaiser, except where noted.

Sources: Liner notes, Discogs, Fred Frith discography.

Hidden tracks
This compilation has two hidden tracks not listed in the liner notes:

Personnel
Fred Frith – electric and acoustic guitars, 4 and 6 string bass guitars, LinnDrum programming, violin, marimba, piano, Casio 202 organ
Henry Kaiser – electric and acoustic guitars, 6 string bass guitar, LinnDrum programming, electric sitar, banjo, piano

Sources: Liner notes, Discogs, Fred Frith discography.

Sound
Engineering by Oliver DiCicco
Produced and mixed by Fred Frith and Henry Kaiser
Mastered by Paul Stubblebine
Wood figurines by Henry Turner
Photography (Frith, Kaiser, DiCicco) by Carol LeMaitre
Photography (figurines) by Alden Ludlow
CD liner notes by Oliver DiCicco
CD package design by David Greenberger

Sources: Liner notes, Discogs, Fred Frith discography.

References

1999 compilation albums
Collaborative albums
Experimental music albums
Free improvisation albums
Fred Frith albums
Henry Kaiser (musician) albums
Cuneiform Records compilation albums